Frank Gallagher (April 28, 1870 Brooklyn, Kings County, New York – June 10, 1932 Manhattan, New York City) was an American politician from New York.

Life
He attended the public schools and St. Peter's Academy. He graduated from St. John's College in 1888, and then became a journalist. In 1891, he became a political writer for the Brooklyn Daily Eagle.

Gallagher was a member of the New York State Assembly (Kings Co., 4th D.) in 1895.

He was a member of the New York State Senate (3rd D.) from 1896 to 1898, sitting in the 119th, 120th and 121st New York State Legislatures.

For some years he was the secretary of the Bush Terminal Company of Brooklyn. Subsequently he moved to a law firm Dykman, Oeland & Khune also in Brooklyn.

On January 2, 1913, he was appointed by Mayor William Jay Gaynor as President of the New York City Civil Service Commission after being an Examiner for the Commission for thirteen years.

He died on June 11, 1932, in the French Hospital in Manhattan, of a "heart attack".

Sources
 The New York Red Book compiled by Edgar L. Murlin (published by James B. Lyon, Albany NY, 1897; pg. 147f, 404 and 511)
 Sketches of the members of the Legislature in The Evening Journal Almanac (1895; pg. 55)
 NEW CIVIL SERVICE HEAD in NYT on January 3, 1913
 FRANK GALLAGHER, EX-LEGISLATOR, DIES in NYT on June 11, 1932 (Subscription required)

1870 births
1932 deaths
Democratic Party New York (state) state senators
People from Brooklyn
Democratic Party members of the New York State Assembly
St. John's University (New York City) alumni